Blackmail is a 1928 thriller play by the British writer Charles Bennett. In Chelsea, an artist's model kills an artist when he attempts to assault her.

It ran for 38 performances at the Globe Theatre in London's West End. Directed by Raymond Massey,  was the playwright's first West End production, chosen by the impresario Albert H. Woods as a vehicle for the American star Tallulah Bankhead. In the event it was shortest British run Bankhead had been in. It was initially considered a disappointment and Woods never staged the play on Broadway. However, over the following decade it became a popular work on tour in Britain and Ireland.

Adaptation
The following year it was made into Blackmail, a pioneering early sound film directed by Alfred Hitchcock and starring Anny Ondra. It was also novelised by Ruth Alexander.

References

Bibliography
 Goble, Alan. The Complete Index to Literary Sources in Film. Walter de Gruyter, 1999.
 Kabatchnik, Amnon. Blood on the Stage, 1925-1950: Milestone Plays of Crime, Mystery and Detection. Scarecrow Press, 2010.
 Wearing, J. P. The London Stage 1920-1929: A Calendar of Productions, Performers, and Personnel. Rowman & Littlefield, 2014.

1928 plays
Plays by Charles Bennett
Thriller plays
British plays adapted into films
Plays set in London
West End plays